Marree may refer to  the following :

Marree, South Australia, a town and locality
Marree Aboriginal School - refer List of schools in South Australia
Marree Airport - refer List of airports by IATA code: R
Marree Man, a geoglyph near Marree, South Australia
Marree Mosque, a mosque in Marree, South Australia
Marree railway line 
Marree railway station, a closed railway station
Marree Subgroup, a geological formation